The vice-president of Kiribati is the deputy head of State of the Republic of Kiribati. His or her constitutional functions are to exercise the duties of the President of Kiribati, temporarily or permanently, should the latter be unable to do so, and to "be responsible for such business of the government (including the administration of any department) as the Beretitenti [President] may assign to him".

The President appoints a Vice-President from among the government ministers. The Vice-President must remain a member of Cabinet throughout his or her term.

The salary of the Vice President is AUD 15,700 annually.

List of vice-presidents

References

 
Government of Kiribati
Kiribati
1979 establishments in Kiribati